The seventh and final season of Cold Case, an American television series, began airing on September 27, 2009 and concluded on May 2, 2010. Season seven regular cast members include Kathryn Morris, Danny Pino, John Finn, Thom Barry, Jeremy Ratchford, and Tracie Thoms. Due to budget constraints, the entire main cast only appeared together in four episodes this season.  

On May 18, 2010 more than 2 weeks after the series finale aired, CBS announced that the show would not be renewed for an eighth season due to low ratings. This season had an average of 9.86 million viewers and ranked 29th, being the least watched season of the series.

Cast

Episodes

References

2009 American television seasons
2010 American television seasons
Cold Case seasons